In the two-round system, there is potential for both tactical voting and strategic nomination. Tactical voting is where voters do not vote in accordance with their true preferences, but instead vote insincerely in an attempt to influence the result. Runoff voting is intended as a method that reduces tactical voting, but two tactics called compromising and pushover are still possible in many circumstances. In particular voters are strongly encouraged to compromise by voting for one of the three leading candidates in the first round of an election.

Strategic nomination is where candidates and political factions influence the result of an election by either nominating extra candidates or withdrawing a candidate who would otherwise have stood. Runoff is intended to reduce the spoiler effect, but it does not eliminate it. A famous example of the importance of both strategic nomination and tactical voting in runoff voting was the 2002 French presidential election.

Sample election

For illustrative purposes, the following is a sample election that does not involve any tactical manipulation. Imagine an election to choose which food to eat for dessert. There are 100 people having dessert and three candidates: Ice Cream, Apple Pie and Fruit. Runoff voting is used to find the winner.

Round 1: In the first round of voting each diner votes for the one candidate they most prefer. The results are as follows:

Ice Cream: 43 votes
Apple Pie: 16 votes
Fruit: 41 votes

Round 2: No candidate has an absolute majority of votes (in this election that would be 51) so the two candidates with the most votes, Ice Cream and Fruit, proceed to a second round, while Apple Pie is eliminated. Because their favourite candidate has been eliminated Apple Pie supporters must now vote for one of the two remaining candidates. The Apple Pie supporters split into two even groups: 8 vote for Ice Cream and 8 for Fruit. Of those who supported Ice Cream and Fruit in the first round, no one decides to change their vote. The results of the second round are, therefore, as follows:

Ice Cream: 51
Fruit: 49

Result: Ice Cream now has an absolute majority so is declared the winner.

Tactical voting

Runoff voting attempts to reduce the potential for tactical voting by eliminating wasted votes. Under the first past the post (plurality) system, voters are indirectly encouraged to vote tactically by voting only for one of the two leading candidates, as a vote for any other candidate will not affect the result. Under runoff voting this tactic, known as compromising, is sometimes unnecessary because, even if a voter's favourite candidate is eliminated in the first round, she will still have an opportunity to influence the result of the election by voting for a more popular candidate in the second round. However, the tactic of compromising can still be used in runoff voting because it is sometimes necessary to compromise as a way of influencing which two candidates will survive to the second round.

Compromise

Compromising is where a voter gives a first or other preference to a candidate, not because they necessarily support them, but as a way of avoiding the election of a candidate who they dislike even more. The compromising tactic is sometimes effective because runoff voting eliminates many candidates in the first round, and these often include a candidate who might have received an absolute majority of votes had the candidate been permitted to participate in the second round. This creates strong incentives for voters to vote tactically in the first round to ensure that at least one of the two candidates who survives to the second round is acceptable to them. To do this, it is necessary to vote for one of the three leading candidates in the first round, just as in an election held under the plurality system it is necessary to vote for one of the two leading candidates.

Whether or not compromising will be an effective tactic depends on the precise candidates and voting patterns present in each election. For example, if there are two very popular centrist candidates standing in the election, such that the outcome of the first round is inevitable, then compromise will be unnecessary.

Examples

In Example I above, if Fruit supporters had voted tactically for Apple Pie in the first round then Apple Pie (their second choice) would have been elected instead of Ice Cream (their last choice). By voting tactically, they ensure that Apple Pie has the opportunity to advance to the second round, Apple Pie is then able to achieve an absolute majority. However in the following election compromising is unnecessary; in the first round 100 voters vote as follows:

Far-Left candidate: 10
Centre-Left candidate: 41
Centre-Right candidate: 40
Far-Right candidate: 9

If the second preference of Far-Left voters is the Centre-Left candidate, and the second preference of Far-Right voters is the Centre-Right candidate, the result of the second round will be as follows:

Centre-Left candidate: 51
Centre-Right candidate: 49

In this election, once the Far-left Candidate is eliminated, the supporters have the opportunity to vote for the Centre-Left candidate in the second round; thus it is unnecessary and ineffective for Far-Left supporters to vote tactically for the Centre-Left candidate. For the same reason, the outcome will not be altered if Far-Right supporters vote tactically in the first round for Centre-Right.

Were the election conducted using the plurality system, compromising would be effective. For example, if Far-Right supporters voted tactically for Centre-Right then they would be elected instead of Centre-Left. To counteract this tactic Far-Left supporters would also have to vote tactically. In this example, therefore, runoff voting removes the potential for tactical voting that would be there under the plurality system.

Push over

Pushover is a tactic by which voters vote tactically for an unpopular pushover candidate in the first round to help their true favourite candidate win in the second round. The purpose of voting for the pushover is to ensure that it is this weak candidate, rather than a stronger rival, who remains to challenge a voter's preferred candidate in round two. By supporting a pushover candidate, it is hoped to eliminate a stronger candidate who might have won the second round. The pushover tactic requires voters to be able to predict, reliably, how others will vote. It runs the risk of backfiring, as if the tactical voter miscalculates, the candidate intended as a pushover might end up actually beating the voter's preferred candidate in the second round.

Example

Imagine an election, like the one at the start of this article, in which there are 100 voters who vote as follows:

Ice cream: 25 votes
Apple Pie: 30 votes
Fruit: 45 votes

No candidate has an absolute majority of votes so Ice cream is eliminated in the first round. Ice cream supporters prefer Apple Pie to Fruit so in the second round they vote for Apple Pie and Apple Pie is the winner. However, if only six Fruit supporters had used the tactic of pushover, they could have changed this outcome and ensured the election of Fruit. These six voters can do this by voting for Ice cream in the first round as a pushover. If they do this then the votes cast in the first round will look like this:

Ice cream: 31
Apple Pie: 30
Fruit: 39

This will mean that Apple Pie is eliminated in the first round instead of Ice cream. This outcome is deliberate. The tactical voters know that Ice cream will be an easier candidate for Fruit to beat in the second round than Apple Pie. In the second round the tactical voters vote for their real first preference, Fruit. Thus, even if only 6 Apple Pie supporters prefer Fruit to Icecream, the result of the second round will be as follows:

Icecream: 49
Fruit: 51

Fruit will be elected. The success of this tactic relies on the Fruit supporters being able to predict that Ice cream can be beaten by Fruit in the second round. If a large majority of Apple Pie supporters had voted for Ice cream then the pushover tactic would have backfired, leading to the election of Ice cream, which Fruit partisans like even less than Apple Pie.

Strategic nomination

Runoff voting can be influenced by strategic nomination; candidates and political factions influence the result of an election by either nominating extra candidates or withdrawing a candidate who would otherwise have stood. Runoff voting is vulnerable to strategic nomination for the same reasons that it is open to the voting tactic of compromising. This is because it is sometimes necessary for a candidate who knows they are unlikely to win to ensure that another candidate he supports makes it to the second round by withdrawing from the race before the first round occurs, or by never choosing to stand in the first place. By withdrawing candidates a political faction can avoid the spoiler effect, whereby a candidate splits the vote of her supporters and prevents any candidate acceptable to them from surviving to the last round.

Runoff voting's system of two rounds makes it less vulnerable to the spoiler effect than the plurality system. This is because a potential spoiler candidate often has only minor support so that candidate will not take away sufficient support from any candidate likely to win in the second round to prevent the other candidate from surviving to that point. Voters can counteract the effect of vote splitting in the first round, in the two-round system, by using the compromise tactic. The spoiler effect is impossible in the second round because there are only two candidates.

Because it is vulnerable to certain forms of strategic nomination, IRV is said by electoral scientists to fail the independence of irrelevant alternatives criterion. This criterion is so strict that it is failed by almost all voting systems, even those that are less susceptible to strategic nomination than runoff voting.

2002 French presidential election

The 2002 French presidential election is a famous example of the importance of both tactical voting and strategic nomination in runoff voting. The three main candidates were Jacques Chirac of the centre-right, Lionel Jospin of the centre-left, and the far-right Jean-Marie Le Pen. However there were sixteen candidates in total.

In French presidential elections, the usual outcome is for one candidate of the centre-right and one of the centre-left to proceed to the second round. However, in 2002, the two candidates to advance to the second round were Chirac and Le Pen. Chircac then won the election but the inclusion of Le Pen in the second round was highly controversial, because of what many considered his 'extreme' political views. Le Pen was an unpopular candidate, as testified by the fact that he won only 18% of the vote in the second round. Had Jospin proceeded to the second round, as expected, it would have been a closer contest. In the first round the results were as follows:

The right

Jacques Chirac (Rally for the Republic): 19.88%
Jean-Marie Le Pen (National Front): 16.86%
François Bayrou (Union for French Democracy): 6.84%
Alain Madelin (Liberal Democracy): 3.91%
Bruno Mégret (National Republican Movement): 2.34%
Christine Boutin (Forum of Social Republicans): 1.19%
Total: 51.02%

The left

Lionel Jospin (Socialist Party): 16.18%
Arlette Laguiller (Workers' Struggle) 5.72%
Noël Mamère (The Greens) 5.25%
Olivier Besancenot (Revolutionary Communist League) 4.25%
Robert Hue (French Communist Party) 3.37%
Christiane Taubira (Left Radical Party) 2.32%
Daniel Gluckstein (Party of the Workers) 0.47%
Total: 37.56%

The reason that the left had no candidate in the second round was not a shortage of voters. As can be seen above, more than 37% of voters supported left-wing candidates. The problem was that the left-wing vote was split between seven different candidates. The left could have improved its performance using strategic nomination. If even a small left-wing party had withdrawn its candidate, Jospin might have had enough votes to avoid elimination. On the other hand, even with seven different candidates, left-wing voters could have altered the first round by voting tactically.

If only about 2% more left-wing voters had practiced the tactic of compromise and voted for Jospin rather than their true favourite, then he would have survived elimination. One reason that Jospin was eliminated was that many voters assumed that he would survive to the second round and so felt free to cast a protest vote for a minor candidate, rather than vote tactically. Had Jospin survived, by tactical voting or strategic nomination, it is possible he could have won the second round and beaten Chirac.

A similar situation occurred in Louisiana, which uses a form of runoff voting called the run-off primary election. In 1991, white supremacist David Duke secured enough votes to be admitted to the second round, in place of the incumbent governor, who would have been expected to survive. In the second round Duke lost to the much more moderate Edwin Edwards.

Notes

Runoff voting
Voting theory